ISO 3307 is an international standard for date and time representations issued by the International Organization for Standardization (ISO).  The standard was issued in 1975, then was superseded by ISO 8601 in 1988.

References

03307